Infigratinib, sold under the brand name Truseltiq, is an anti-cancer medication used to treat cholangiocarcinoma (bile duct cancer).

Infigratinib is a kinase inhibitor targeting the fibroblast growth factor receptors FGFR1, FGFR2 and FGFR3 It was designated an orphan drug by the US Food and Drug Administration (FDA) in 2019, and it was approved for medical use in the United States in May 2021.

Medical uses 
Infigratinib is indicated for the treatment of adults with previously treated, unresectable locally advanced or metastatic cholangiocarcinoma (bile duct cancer) with a fibroblast growth factor receptor 2 (FGFR2) fusion or other rearrangement as detected by an FDA-approved test.

References

External links 
 
 

Orphan drugs
Receptor tyrosine kinase inhibitors